Division No. 9, Canada, is one of the eighteen census divisions within the province of Saskatchewan, as defined by Statistics Canada. It is located in the eastern part of the province, bordering Manitoba. The most populous community in this division is Yorkton.

Demographics 

Census subdivisions 
The following census subdivisions (municipalities or municipal equivalents) are located within Saskatchewan's Division No. 9.

Cities
Yorkton

Towns
Canora
Kamsack
Norquay
Preeceville
Springside
Sturgis

Villages

Arran
Buchanan
Calder
Ebenezer
Endeavour
Hyas
Invermay
Lintlaw
Pelly
Rama
Rhein
Sheho
Stenen
Theodore
Togo

Rural municipalities

 RM No. 241 Calder
 RM No. 243 Wallace
 RM No. 244 Orkney
 RM No. 245 Garry
 RM No. 271 Cote
 RM No. 273 Sliding Hills
 RM No. 274 Good Lake
 RM No. 275 Insinger
 RM No. 301 St. Philips
 RM No. 303 Keys
 RM No. 304 Buchanan
 RM No. 305 Invermay
 RM No. 331 Livingston
 RM No. 333 Clayton
 RM No. 334 Preeceville
 RM No. 335 Hazel Dell

Indian reserves

 Cote First Nation
Cote 64
 Keeseekoose First Nation
 Keeseekoose 66
 Keeseekoose 66A
 Keeseekoose 66-CA-04
 Keeseekoose 66-CA-05
 Keeseekoose 66-CA-06
 Keeseekoose 66-KE-04
 Keeseekoose 66-KE-05
 The Key First Nation
 The Key 65

See also 
List of census divisions of Saskatchewan
List of communities in Saskatchewan

References

Division No. 9, Saskatchewan Statistics Canada

 
09